Zinc finger protein Gfi-1 is a transcriptional repressor that in humans is encoded by the GFI1 gene. It is important normal hematopoiesis.

Interactions 

GFI1 has been shown to interact with PIAS3 and RUNX1T1.

References

Further reading

External links 
 

Transcription factors